Oh My Gods might refer to:

Oh My Gods!, a webcomic written and illustrated by Shivian Montar Balaris
Oh. My. Gods., a 2008 young adult fantasy novel by Tera Lynn Childs

See also 
Oh My God (disambiguation)